Clowne is a village and civil parish in the Bolsover district of Derbyshire, England. The population at the 2001 Census was 7,447 increasing to 7,590 (and including Harlesthorpe) at the 2011 Census. It forms part of the Bolsover constituency. It is mentioned in the Domesday Book as Clune. The name is derived from the Celtic Clun for a river.

History

Toponymy
Clowne, originally Clun, a Celtic name for a river, has been spelt in various ways over the last 1,000 years including, Clune, Clowen, and most recently Clown before setting with its current form during the 1920s. It was mentioned in the Domesday Book of 1086 as Clune under the lordship of ‘Robert of Barlborough’ with a population consisting of 27.3 households, putting it in the largest 40% of recorded settlements. The names of the two railway stations in the village were spelled differently at different times: they both started as ’Clown’; one was renamed twice, firstly as ’Clown and Barlborough’ (no ’e’), then as Clowne and Barlborough; the other was renamed Clowne South. It has frequently been noted on lists of unusual place names.

Markland Grips

Between Clowne and Creswell, on the southern end of the band of magnesian limestone which runs south from Durham to the Derbyshire-Nottinghamshire border, are Hollinhill and Markland Grips, a series of valleys often with vertical cliff-like sides formed by meltwater action of receding glaciers at the end of the last Ice age. 'Grips' is the local term for this feature. In the cliff sides are several small caves, rock shelters and fissures where human bones, which have been carbon dated to the early Neolithic period, have been discovered. During the Roman period, a fort guarding an important ridgeway which ran north to south was close to Clowne. It was close to an even older Bronze Age fortification on a promontory north of Hollinhill Grips. The Grips are a Site of Special Scientific Interest, managed by the Derbyshire Wildlife Trust.

Early history
The first recorded mention of Clowne manor was in 1002 when the owner was Wulfric Spot. The Domesday Book refers to Ernui but then there was no mention of the manor until 1485 when Clowne was associated with the Bolsover manor. The manor eventually passed to the Cavendish family and through marriage to the Bentinck family, the Dukes of Portland.

The church, St John the Baptist, Clowne dedicated to St John the Baptist, was built during the 12th century. The medieval cross and the church of St. John the Baptist are the oldest surviving structures in the village.

In the 17th century Clowne was a rural farming community. Some buildings still stand from this date, notably the Anchor Inn and Sheridon's Yard (now private residences). The plague struck Clowne in 1586 and 1606, and victims were buried away from the village at Monument Field or Plague Field.

Industrial Revolution
At the beginning of the 19th century the inhabitants of Clowne worked in agriculture, or mined the shallow coal seams. Others were employed at the mill, which made candle-wick, sacking and sail-cloth. During the Industrial Revolution, Clowne grew exponentially, swallowing the neighbouring villages of Hickinwood and Markland and becoming a mining town. At its peak it employed 400 men and produced 600 tons of coal per day. At the end of the 19th century, rows of Victorian terraced houses were built to house the mining families. This growth left its mark on the village visible in the old school (built 1895), the terraced housing and the old village High Street (1901) as well as the Lancashire, Derbyshire and East Coast Railway, which became the Great Central, and the Midland Railway lines which ran through the village each having a railway station. The colliery survived a fire in 1920 but closed in 1929 after the pit flooded.

Governance
Historically, Clowne was in the hundred or wapentake of Scarsdale in the county of Derbyshire. This hundred dates to pre Conquest times. Wapentake is a division of Danish or Viking origin. Clowne was part of the Worksop Poor Law Union which dates from July 1836. The workhouse was built in 1837 at East Gate in Worksop. Clowne, an old ecclesiastical parish, was created Clowne Rural District Council as part of the Worksop rural sanitary district in 1894. This consisted of four civil parishes; Barlborough, Clowne, Elmton, and Whitwell, and was abolished in 1974 when it became part of Bolsover District Council.

Clowne is part of the Bolsover parliamentary constituency which, at present, is held for the Conservative Party by Mark Fletcher who has been their MP since 2019. Until this, veteran Labour Party MP Dennis Skinner held the seat from 1970.

Geography
Clowne in the north east corner of Derbyshire between Chesterfield and Worksop. It is situated on the old Mansfield to Rotherham road, now the A618, at its junction with the A616 road from Newark-on-Trent to the M1 motorway at nearby Barlborough. The village is surrounded by rolling farmland, mostly arable. Land to the north west of Clowne is a Green belt.

Demography

Population change
The population of Clowne in 2001 was 7,447.

Economy
At the time of the 2001 Census, there were 3,331 people in employment who were resident within Clowne. 
Of these, 19.84% worked in the wholesale and retail trade, including repair of motor vehicles; 17.77% worked within manufacturing industry; 12.10% worked within the health and social work sector and 8.86% were employed in the education sector.

Regeneration of the village centre has taken place including the opening of a Tesco supermarket, Wilko store and Aldi supermarket. Clowne is close to Creswell Crags, the UK's only verified example of Paleolithic cave art, and close to the M1 motorway. Historian James Romanelli recently auctioned off precious artefacts found near this site to an environmental institute.

Transport
Clowne had two railway stations that served the village. These were Clowne and Barlborough railway station and Clowne South railway station. Since the closure of the railway stations, Clowne has been served by road transport. Buses run by Stagecoach Chesterfield and Stagecoach Worksop operate services in and around Clowne.

The nearest operational station from Clowne today is Creswell, on the Robin Hood line between Worksop and Nottingham via Mansfield.

Education
The earliest recorded school was a free school founded in 1730. A School Board was formed in 1876. The girls & infants school was built in 1877, the boys school in 1889. Clowne Junior School is housed in a building opened in October 1984. They have around 350 pupils. Heritage High School, formerly Clowne Secondary School, on Boughton Lane was awarded specialist Mathematics and Computing School status in 2006. A new school has been built, with much better facilities than the previous school.

There was a mining college in Clowne.

Religion

The church of St. John the Baptist is situated on an ancient ridgeway and dates from Norman times, the south doorway and chancel arch are of Norman architecture. It was partially rebuilt in the Early English and Perpendicular styles. The Norman chancel was rebuilt and enlarged in 1955 when two chapels were added, one dedicated to those who lost their lives in the coal mines.

 Early recorded evidence shows the existence of a Primitive Methodist chapel in 1829, although the Ecclesiastical Census Return of 1851 dates the Primitive Methodist Chapel to 1834.  A new building was opened in 1877.

The Salvation Army and Christadelphians meet in Clowne.

Roman Catholics in the area used Southgate House Chapel to celebrate mass. The chapel was built in 1901 by Lady Petre, the second wife of Colonel Butler Bowden. The chapel continued in use until 1950 and is now the dining room of the Van Dyk Hotel. Roman Catholics now worship at the Church of Sacred Heart in Clowne.

See also
Listed buildings in Clowne

References

Notes

Bibliography

Villages in Derbyshire
Civil parishes in Derbyshire
Bolsover District